The brasilia lyrefin (Cynolebias boitonei) is a species of fish in the family Aplocheilidae. It is endemic to Brazil.

References
 

Cynolebias
Fish of Brazil
Endemic fauna of Brazil
Taxonomy articles created by Polbot
Taxobox binomials not recognized by IUCN